Omnia Abdel Khalek Fakhry (born February 2, 1982, in Cairo) is an Egyptian modern pentathlete. Fakhry qualified for the 2008 Summer Olympics in Beijing, where she competed in the women's modern pentathlon, along with her teammate Aya Medany.
During the competition, Fakhry made a strong performance in the early rounds, when she finished fifth in pistol shooting, and eighteenth in a one-touch épée fencing. She placed second in the third heat in the 200 m freestyle swimming, but displayed a poor performance in the show jumping, when her horse Naonao repeatedly stopped short, veered left before the obstacles, and nearly tossed her over the barrier. In the end, Fakhry finished the event with cross-country running in thirtieth place, for a total score of 4,996 points.

References

External links
  (archived page from Pentathlon.org)
 NBC 2008 Olympics profile

1982 births
Living people
Egyptian female modern pentathletes
Olympic modern pentathletes of Egypt
Modern pentathletes at the 2008 Summer Olympics
World Modern Pentathlon Championships medalists
Sportspeople from Cairo